Nassarius optimus is a species of sea snail, a marine gastropod mollusc in the family Nassariidae, the nassa snails.

Description
The shell size varies between 20 mm and 30 mm.

Distribution
This species occurs in the Indian Ocean off Madagascar and in the Pacific Ocean off Northern Australia, the Philippines and New Caledonia.

References

 Dautzenberg, Ph. (1929). Mollusques testacés marins de Madagascar. Faune des Colonies Francaises, Tome III
 Cernohorsky W.O. (1981). Revision of the Australian and New Zealand Tertiary and Recent species of the family Nassariidae (Mollusca: Gastropoda). Records of the Auckland Institute and Museum 18:137–192
 Cernohorsky W. O. (1984). Systematics of the family Nassariidae (Mollusca: Gastropoda). Bulletin of the Auckland Institute and Museum 14: 1–356
 Petit R.E. (2009) George Brettingham Sowerby, I, II & III: their conchological publications and molluscan taxa. Zootaxa 2189: 1–218.

External links
 

Nassariidae
Gastropods described in 1903